Xylophanes mulleri is a moth of the  family Sphingidae. It is known from Mexico.

The length of the forewings is about 33 mm. The forewing upperside is uniform brown and separated from a well-developed brown fourth postmedian line by a strongly contrasting pale yellow line running from the inner margin to the apex. The fifth postmedian line and two submarginal lines are brown and conspicuous against a paler brown ground.

Adults are probably on wing year-round.

The larvae probably feed on Rubiaceae and Malvaceae species.

References

mulleri
Moths described in 1920
Endemic Lepidoptera of Mexico